Phil Keaggy and Sunday's Child is the title of a 1988 album by guitarist Phil Keaggy, released on Myrrh Records and A&M Records simultaneously.

The record, which includes an all-star list of guest musicians and vocalists, is in many ways a tribute to 1960s pop/rock music like The Byrds, The Beatles, and others.

The album's sound quality, which came from the use of vintage instruments and production techniques, was unique by 1988's standards. Among the vintage instruments used was Ringo Starr's drum kit, per the album's liner notes ("SPECIAL THANKS...to the DRUM DOCTOR for the use of Ringo's old drum kit").

Track listing
 "Tell Me How You Feel" (Phil Keaggy) – 3:21
 "Sunday's Child" (Randy Stonehill, Phil Keaggy) – 3:57
 "I Always Do" (Mark Heard) – 4:50
 "I'm Gonna Get You Now" (Phil Keaggy, Lynn Nichols) – 3:47
 "Blessed Be the Ties" (Lynn Nichols, Phil Keaggy, Steve Taylor) – 3:56
 "This Could Be the Moment" (Angelo Palladino, Lynn Nichols) – 3:48
 "Ain't Got No" (Randy and Sandi Stonehill) – 3:29
 "Somebody Loves You" (Phil Keaggy) – 4:05
 "Big Eraser" (Lynn Nichols, Lance  Demers, Phil Keaggy) – 4:33
 "Everything Is Alright" (Mark Heard) (omitted from vinyl version) – 5:00
 "I've Just Begun (Again)" (Phil Keaggy, Lynn Nichols) – 3:00
 "Walk in Two Worlds" (Randy Stonehill, Phil Keaggy) – 3:37
 "Talk About Suffering" (Traditional: Arranged by Phil Keaggy) – 4:50

Personnel
 Phil Keaggy – lead vocals, guitar (1–5, 7–13), backing vocals (1, 6–9, 11, 12, 13), bass guitar (1, 3, 5), handclaps (1), first guitar solo (6)
 James Hollihan – guitar (1–5, 7–13), second guitar solo (6)
 Randy Stonehill – guitar (2), lead vocals (2, 7), backing vocals (7)
 Mark Heard – guitar (3), backing vocals (6, 8, 13), keyboards (10)
 Lynn Nichols – guitar (5), backing vocals (7, 9, 11, 12)
 Robbie Buchanan – Hammond B3 organ (3, 6, 7, 12)
 Rick Cua – bass guitar (2, 4, 6–13)
 Mike Mead – drums
 Lenny Castro – percussion (1, 2, 5–10, 12, 13), handclaps (1)
 Steve Taylor – handclaps (1)
 Rudy Valentine – megaphone (4)
 Jimmie Lee Sloas – backing vocals (6, 13)
 Russ Taff – lead vocals (7), backing vocals (7, 12)
 Alwyn Wall – backing vocals (8)
 Derri Daugherty – backing vocals (9, 11)

Production
 Lynn Arthur Nichols – producer
 Jack Joseph Puig – director of recording, mixing
 Eddie Keaggy – mix assistant
 Dave Hackbarth – mix assistant
 KC McMackin – mix assistant
 Bart Stevens – mix assistant
 Wade Jaynes – mix assistant
 Brian Tankersley – additional engineer
 Mark Heard – additional engineer
 Ben Pearson – photography

References 

1988 albums
Phil Keaggy albums